The 2014–15 FC Lokomotiv Moscow season was the club's 23rd season in the Russian Premier League, the highest tier of association football in Russia. Lokomotiv Moscow also takes part in the Russian Cup and the Europa League.

Season review
On 17 September 2014, Leonid Kuchuk resigned from the manager post after deterioration of his relationships with players. The next day Igor Cherevchenko was appointed as the club's caretaker manager. On 4 October 2014, Miodrag Božović was appointed as a new caretaker manager until conditions of Kuchuk's deal termination are worked out. On 10 October 2014, Božović signed a permanent deal as a manager, but resigned on 11 May 2015 with Igor Cherevchenko again taking control of Lokomotiv as caretaker manager.
Despite poor performances in the league, Lokomotiv won the Russian Cup, overtaking Kuban Krasnodar 3–1 after extra time and booking place in next season's Europa League.

Squad

Out on loan

Youth squad

Transfers

Summer

In:

Out:

Winter

In:

Out:

Competitions

Russian Premier League

Results by round

Matches

League table

Russian Cup

UEFA Europa League

Qualifying phase

Squad statistics

Appearances and goals

|-
|colspan="14"|Players away from the club on loan:

|-
|colspan="14"|Players who appeared for Lokomotiv Moscow no longer at the club:

|}

Goalscorers

Disciplinary record

Club captains
During the season, three players fulfilled the duties of club captain: captain Guilherme and vice-captains Roman Shishkin and Aleksandr Samedov.

Player of the Month
During the season, Lokomotiv ran a monthly poll on social networks to gauge the fans player of the month.

Player of the Year
After the season, Lokomotiv fans' poll named the team's player of the year.

Notes
 MSK time changed from UTC+4 to UTC+3 permanently on 26 October 2014.

References

FC Lokomotiv Moscow seasons
Lokomotiv Moscow
Lokomotiv Moscow